Sofía Agnes MacKenzie (born June 20, 1972) is a former field hockey defender from Argentina who nearly played one hundred international matches for the Women's National Team. She was a member of the squad that finished in seventh place at the 1996 Summer Olympics in Atlanta, Georgia. At the 1998 Women's Hockey World Cup, she competed in her last international tournament.

References

  Argentine Hockey Federation
 sports-reference

External links
 

1972 births
Living people
Argentine female field hockey players
Las Leonas players
Field hockey players at the 1996 Summer Olympics
Olympic field hockey players of Argentina
Place of birth missing (living people)
Argentine people of Scottish descent
Argentine people of British descent
Pan American Games gold medalists for Argentina
Pan American Games medalists in field hockey
Field hockey players at the 1991 Pan American Games
Field hockey players at the 1995 Pan American Games
Medalists at the 1995 Pan American Games
Medalists at the 1991 Pan American Games